Alucita pectinata is a moth of the family Alucitidae. It is found in Greece.

References

Moths described in 1994
Alucitidae
Moths of Europe